Myles Stanley Joseph Lane (October 2, 1903 – August 6, 1987) was an American professional ice hockey player, college football player and coach, and New York Supreme Court justice. He played in the National Hockey League with the New York Rangers and Boston Bruins between 1928 and 1934. With the Bruins he won the Stanley Cup in 1929; he was the last surviving member of the team.

Hockey
A star player at Dartmouth College, Lane signed with the New York Rangers on October 1, 1928. He became only the third American-born player and the first American-trained player to join the National Hockey League.

In 1928, Lane was offered by the Rangers to the Bruins for Eddie Shore and $5,000. Rangers president John S. Hammond believed that because Lane was such a hero in his home state, the Bruins would do anything to acquire him. According to former Rangers publicity director Stan Saplin, who got the story from Lester Patrick, the telegram Bruins' president, Charles F. Adams sent back read: GET A LIFE PRESERVER - YOU ARE MYLES FROM SHORE. The Rangers later sold his contract to the Bruins for $7,500. He was with the Bruins when they won the Stanley Cup in 1929. From 1931 to 1934, played for the minor league Boston Cubs of the Canadian-American Hockey League.

Football
Lane was an all-American halfback at Dartmouth from 1925 to 1928, where he led the nation in scoring.

After his playing career ended, Lane turned to coaching. In 1929, he was Dartmouth's backfield coach as well as head coach of the freshman team. In 1932, he was head football coach at Boston University. He had a 2–3–2 record in his only season with the Terriers. He was the backfield coach at Harvard in 1933 where he coached, among others, his brother Francis Lane.

Lane was elected to the College Football Hall of Fame in 1970.

Baseball
From 1929 to 1931, Lane played summer baseball for the Osterville town team in the Cape Cod Baseball League. He was reportedly a "hard-hitting" player who was "liable to grab a homer at any point."

Legal career
After graduating from Boston College Law School in 1934, Lane joined the firm of O'Connor & Farber. Three years later he was appointed an assistant United States attorney for the U.S. Attorney for the Southern District of New York. He then spent four years in the Navy in World War II. After the war he rejoined the US Attorney's office, becoming chief assistant. He was a member of the prosecution team in the Rosenberg trial. At this appointment, he became an integral piece in convicting Ethel Rosenberg on the count of conspiracy to commit espionage; a charge resulting in her death alongside her husband Julius Rosenberg in 1953. Though, admittedly, the case against Ethel was "not strong" Lane encouraged a closed-door congressional joint committee on Atomic Energy: "... I think it is very important that she be convicted, too, and given a stiff sentence."

In September 1951, Lane was appointed United States Attorney, a position he held until April 1953, when he returned to private law practice. He was a Democrat.

In 1958, Lane was appointed chairman of the State Investigation Commission by governor W. Averell Harriman. During his years with the commission, the agency looked into issues such as school building flaws, hospital abuses, narcotics problems, underworld activities and bid-rigging on New York City's purchases of rock salt.

Lane was elected to the New York Supreme Court in 1968. One notable case Lane decided was known as the "dog case". He ruled that "the present circumstances of rampant crime" allowed a woman to keep her schnauzer despite a lease forbidding dogs. He was subsequently overruled by an appeals court.

Lane was appointed to the New York Supreme Court, Appellate Division, First Department in 1974, where he remained until his retirement in 1979.

Personal life
Lane and his wife, Margaret, lived in New York.

Career statistics

Regular season and playoffs

Head coaching record

References

External links
 
 
 New York Times Obituary
 
 

1903 births
1987 deaths
20th-century American lawyers
American men's ice hockey defensemen
Boston Bruins players
Boston College Law School alumni
Boston Cubs players
Boston University Terriers football coaches
Cape Cod Baseball League players (pre-modern era)
College Football Hall of Fame inductees
Dartmouth Big Green football coaches
Dartmouth Big Green football players
Dartmouth Big Green men's ice hockey players
Harvard Crimson football coaches
Hyannis Harbor Hawks players
Ice hockey coaches from Massachusetts
New York (state) Democrats
New York (state) lawyers
New York Rangers players
People from Melrose, Massachusetts
Sportspeople from Middlesex County, Massachusetts
Stanley Cup champions
United States Hockey Hall of Fame inductees
United States Navy officers
United States Navy personnel of World War II
Ice hockey players from Massachusetts
Military personnel from Massachusetts